Brushfield is a hamlet and civil parish in the Derbyshire Dales district of Derbyshire, England, in the Peak District National Park.  It is about 8 miles east of Buxton.  According to the 2001 census it had a population of 13. In 2007 it had just three houses. Several holiday lets are run by two separate families. One of these cottages is called the 'Old School House', a small one-bed house of stone.

There are three scheduled monuments in the parish: bowl barrows at Brushfield Hough and Putwell Hill and High Field hlæw, a rare pre-Christian burial monument dating from around 600AD.

References

Towns and villages of the Peak District
Civil parishes in Derbyshire
Hamlets in Derbyshire
Derbyshire Dales